According to the United Nations, human smuggling is defined as “the procurement, in order to obtain, directly or indirectly, a financial or other material benefit, of the illegal entry of a person into a State Party of which the person is not a national or a permanent resident.” Civil unrest in the Middle East in the 21st century and changing European immigration policies have been seen numbers of refugees fleeing their home countries. Migrants rely on human smugglers to assist them in illegal border crossings to Europe. With the help of human smugglers, refugees use different routes to the EU due to varying immigration policies. In between January and September 2015, the most common was the Eastern Mediterranean. Additionally, 2015 saw a major increase in the number of migrants making the Eastern Mediterranean crossing; “There were nearly eight times more detections via the Eastern Mediterranean route in the first nine months of 2015 (401,000) than during the whole of 2014 (51,000).”  The European Migration Network reports that the secondary movements of refugees upon arrival in Europe are heavily influenced by human smugglers. According to the UN, human smuggling is a criminal offense. However, the number of human traffickers in Turkey increased from 4,641 in 2017 to 6,278 in 2018.

Because human smuggling is illegal, little is definitely known about the practice. What is known comes from interviews refugees or smugglers have given to journalists.

Overview 

Prices vary smuggler to smuggler, but a trip across the Mediterranean can cost between $1,000 and $8,600. That price usually covers one spot in an intentionally flimsy dinghy or old fishing boat, often without a life jacket. To maximize their profit, smugglers often use unseaworthy boats filled to well over their intended capacity. This has in recent years led to a high death toll from boats sinking or capsizing. Some smugglers even discourage life jackets because they take up too much space. Many sell counterfeit life jackets that are not actually buoyant. Some of the life preservers sold on the coast of Turkey have labels reading “this is not a lifesaving device”.

Communication 
Modern technology has allowed human smuggling rings in the Middle East to thrive. The “Smugglers Market” Facebook group had 640 members before it was removed by Facebook for violating community standards. It contained contact information for smugglers, price options for forged documents like marriage licenses, university degrees, and passports. Additionally, smugglers use WhatsApp as a way to instant message the refugees that they are smuggling.

Criticism and proposed solutions 
Many world leaders have criticized Turkey for its lax policies against human smuggling. President of Greece Prokopis Pavlopoulos said “I have a strong fear that Turkish smugglers have the support of the authorities, in particular, border authorities who act like they have seen nothing.”  Other critics of the human smuggling crisis in the Mediterranean claim the issue continues due to European countries’ nonuniform efforts to halt smugglers. Chairman of the Europa-Institut Christof Zellenberg stated “By inviting [people] in but closing all of the tracks, we are basically building a business model for traffickers.”  François Crépeau, United Nations Special Rapporteur, suggests “What is needed is for states to reclaim the mobility market from the hands of the smugglers through offering safe, legal, and cheap mobility solutions to the many, and to build an open but controlled mobility regime over a generation.”

References 

Human trafficking
Syrian refugees
Mediterranean Sea
Migrant boat disasters in the Mediterranean Sea